The 1962–63 Algerian Championnat National was the first season of the Algerian Championnat National. USM Alger won the first title after beating MC Alger in the final.

Criterions of Honour

Algiers

Group I

Group II

Group III

Group IV

Group V

Constantine

Oran

Final Groups

Algiers

Constantine

Oran

Final tournament

External links
1962–63 Algerian Championnat National

Algerian Ligue Professionnelle 1 seasons
1962–63 in Algerian football
Algeria